Pierre Éloi Fouquier (26 July 1776  – 1850) was a physician and professor of medicine.
Fouquier was born in Maissemy.   He died in Paris.

Titles and works 
He was a member of the Académie Nationale de Médecine in 1820, and its president in 1842.
He was a member of the High Commission for Medical Studies.
He was the doctor of  Charles X  (1757-1836) and of  Louis-Philippe (1773-1850) in 1840.
He was Commander of the Legion of Honor in 1847.
He is a translator of the "Treatise on Medicine" by  Celse and the "Elements of Medicine" by  Brown.

George Engelmann (1809-1884) named in his honor the  genus  Fouquieria .

References

1776 births
1850 deaths
19th-century French physicians
18th-century French physicians
People from Aisne